Approaching is the fourth live album by contemporary classical chamber orchestra Symphony Number One. The album was released on November 3, 2017 and features the music of Nicholas Bentz, Martha Horst, and Hangrui Zhang. The majority of the disk is taken up by Nicholas Bentz’s work Approaching Eternity.

Track listing

Personnel
Symphony Number One

Additional musicians

References

External links 

2017 live albums
Symphony Number One albums